Ely Tacchella (25 May 1936 – 2 August 2017) was a Swiss football player born in Neuchâtel.

He got 42 caps for Switzerland, playing all three games at the 1962 World Cup as well as in Switzerland's 0–5 loss to West Germany at the 1966 World Cup.

References

1936 births
2017 deaths
Swiss men's footballers
1962 FIFA World Cup players
1966 FIFA World Cup players
Switzerland international footballers
Association football defenders